Born in Blood is a studio album by American noise rock and Industrial music band Pain Teens, released in 1990. It was their first album for the Trance Syndicate label.

Reception 
Kathleen C. Fennessy of AllMusic wrote that "the Teens have a firm grasp on song structure and Bliss Blood's vocals are always pleasing." The Chicago Reader wrote that when the band "fired on all cylinders—combining filthy guitar fuzz, junkyard industrial beats, sinister psychedelic fuckery, and icy, sneering vocals—they transcended their adolescent fixation on depravity and evil."

Track listing

Personnel 
Adapted from the Born in Blood liner notes.

Pain Teens
 Scott Ayers – guitar, bass guitar, drums, violin, electronics, tape, production, engineering
 Bliss Blood – lead vocals
 Steve Cook – bass guitar
 David Parker – drums

Additional musicians and production
 Ralf Armin – guitar (A2, B3, B5)
 Pain Teens – recording
 Dan Workman – mixing

Release history

References

External links 
 Born in Blood at Bandcamp
 

1990 albums
Pain Teens albums
Albums produced by Scott Ayers
Trance Syndicate albums